The Clontarf Foundation is a not-for-profit organisation that assists in the education and employment of young Aboriginal and Torres Strait Islander men.

Overview

With support from the corporate/philanthropic sector, state/Territory governments and the Federal Government, academies now operate in 141 schools in Western Australia, the Northern Territory, South Australia, Queensland, New South Wales and Victoria.

The founder and Chief Executive Officer is Gerard Neesham, former coach of Fremantle Football Club. Staff include former teachers, youth workers, professional football players and people from a range of industries.

The original Clontarf Football Academy was established in 2000 at the Clontarf Aboriginal College site in Waterford, Western Australia.  Since then, Clontarf academies have expanded to the Northern Territory, South Australia, Queensland, New South Wales and Victoria.

Locations 

Academies now operate in the following locations:

Western Australia –
 Broome Senior High School
 Carnarvon Community College
 Cecil Andrews College
 Champion Bay Senior High School
 Clontarf Aboriginal College
 Coodanup College
 Derby District High School
 East Kimberley College
 Eastern Goldfields College
 Esperance Senior High School
 Fitzroy Valley District High School
 Fremantle College
 Geraldton Senior College
 Gilmore College
 Girrawheen Senior High School
 Halls Creek District High School
 Hedland Senior High School
 Kalgoorlie–Boulder Community High School
 Karratha Senior High School
 Katanning Senior High School
 Newton Moore Senior High School
 North Albany Senior High School
 Northam Senior High School
 Sevenoaks Senior College
 Swan View Senior High School
 Yule Brook College

Northern Territory - 
 Alice Springs - Centralian
 Alice Springs – Yirara College
 Darwin – Dripstone
 Darwin - Nightcliff
 Darwin - Rosebery
 Darwin – Palmerston
 Darwin – Casuarina
 Darwin - Sanderson
 Katherine
 Yirrkala
 Tennant Creek
 Gunbalanya
 Jabiru

Victoria - 
 Bairnsdale
 Mildura
 Robinvale
 Swan Hill
 Warrnambool

Queensland -
 Barambah
 Bentley Park (Cairns)
 Cairns
 Dalby
 Goondiwindi
 Gordonvale (Cairns)
 Gold Coast (PBC)
 Harristown (Toowoomba)
 Heatley (Townsville)
 Kingaroy
 Kirwan (Townsville)
 Thuringowa (Townsville)
 Toowoomba
 Townsville
 Trinity Bay (Cairns)
 Warwick
 Woree (Cairns)
 Wilsonton (Toowoomba)
 Yarrabah (Cairns)

New South Wales - 
 Airds (Campbelltown)
 Bidwill (Mount Druitt)
 Bourke
 Brewarrina
 Broken Hill
 Chatham (Taree)
 Conobolas (Orange)
 Chifley Senior (Mount Druitt)
 Coonamble
 Cranebrook (Penrith)
 Delroy (Dubbo)
 Dubbo Senior (Dubbo)
 Dubbo South (Dubbo)
 Dunheved (Mount Druitt)
 Elizabeth Macarthur (Campbelltown)
 Endeavour (Caringbah)
 Griffith
 Hunter River (Newcastle)
 Inverell
 Irrawang (Newcastle)
 Kanahooka (Wollongong)
 Karabar (Queanbeyan)
 Kempsey
 Lake Illawarra (Wollongong)
 Matraville (Sydney)
 Melville (Kempsey)
 Moree
 Moruya
 Mount Austin (Wagga Wagga)
 Mount Druitt
 Narrabri
 Narrandera
 Narromine
 Newcastle
 Orara (Coffs Harbour)
 Oxley (Tamworth)
 Port Macquarie
 Quirindi
 Shalvey (Mount Druitt)
 Shoalhaven (Nowra)
 Singleton
 Tumut
 Vincentia
 Wade (Griffith)
 Wellington

South Australia -
 Ocean View (Adelaide)
 Paralowie (Adelaide)
 Port Augusta
 Port Lincoln
 Salisbury (Adelaide)
 Whyalla

Sporting stars 

Some of the Clontarf students who have gone on to play football at a professional level include Mark Williams, Dion Woods, Andrew Krakouer, Michael Johnson, Lewis Jetta, Chris Yarran, Patrick Ryder, Joel Hamling and Sam Petrovski-Seton.

References

External links
Clontarf Foundation website
Dept. Education, Employment & Workplace Relations

Foundations based in Australia
Indigenous Australian education
Non-profit organisations based in Australia